Copelatus instabilis is a species of diving beetle. It is part of the genus Copelatus of the subfamily Copelatinae in the family Dytiscidae. It was described by Regimbart in 1897.

References

instabilis
Beetles described in 1897